Charles Galloway may refer to:

 Charles Betts Galloway (1849–1909), American bishop of the Methodist Episcopal Church, South
 Charles Mills Galloway (1875–1954), general counsel to the Controller General of the United States
 Charles Henry Galloway (1871–1931), St. Louis organist, choral conductor, educator, and composer